A flower garden is a garden where flowers are grown for decorative purposes.

Flower garden may also refer to:
Flower Garden (solitaire)
Flower Garden Banks National Marine Sanctuary
 "Flower Garden" by GFriend from the EP Time for the Moon Night